Maciej Stanisław Żurawski (born 12 September 1976) is a Polish former professional footballer who played as a forward.

Żurawski appeared 72 times and scored 17 goals for Poland, representing them at two World Cups and Euro 2008. He also scored 121 goals in the Polish Ekstraklasa (11th most in history) and was the top league goalscorer twice. He also played in Scotland, Greece and Cyprus.

Club career

Warta Poznań
Born in Poznań, Żurawski started his career as a youth at Warta Poznań, the club where his father Andrzej was one of the football coaches. He made his debut for Warta Poznań in Ekstraklasa on 31 July 1994 in a league match against Widzew Łódż, at the age of 17. At the end of his first season, Warta was relegated from the Ekstraklasa.

Lech Poznań
In November 1997, Żurawski went to Lech Poznań on a six-month loan. The loan was extended and, finally, he moved to Lech Poznań on a permanent transfer. Żurawski scored his first Ekstraklasa goal on 29 March 1998 against Górnik Zabrze. In his last game for Lech  on 26 September 1999, he scored two goals against his new club Wisła Kraków. When leaving Lech, he gave autographed cards to fans with the dedication 'Remember Żuraw, the boy who left his heart in Poznań'.

Wisła Kraków
Żurawski made his debut for Wisła Kraków in Ekstraklasa on 2 November 1999 in a match against ŁKS Łódź. On 4 March 2000, he scored his first goal for Wisla in the Ekstraklasa in a match against Odra Wodzisław. He won the Ekstraklasa championship in 2000–01 season with Wisła Kraków. In 2001–02 season, Żurawski scored 21 goals in 27 matches and was the Ekstraklasa top goalscorer. In 2002–03 season Żurawski played very well in UEFA Cup, where he scored ten goals in ten matches, including seven goals in matches against Parma, Schalke 04 and Lazio. When Kamil Kosowski left Wisła Kraków, Żurawski has been chosen new Wisła Kraków captain. In 2003–04 season Żurawski scored 20 goals in 26 matches and led Wisła Kraków to achieve the Ekstraklasa title. He was the Ekstraklasa top goalscorer in 2003–04 season. In 2004–05 he won his fourth Ekstraklasa title with Wisła Kraków. In this season he scored 24 goals in 25 matches for Wisła in Ekstraklasa.

Celtic

He joined Scottish Premier League side Celtic from Wisła Kraków in July 2005 and signed a three-year contract. He inherited the number 7 shirt from Juninho Paulista (previously with Henrik Larsson), and was nicknamed "Magic Żurawski" by the fans.

On 19 February 2006, Żurawski scored four goals as Celtic set a new SPL record by beating Dunfermline Athletic 8–1 at East End Park. Żurawski was subsequently voted the SPL Player of the Month for February. Zurawski finished Celtic's joint top scorer in the 2005–06 season along with John Hartson with 20 goals each.

For the 2006–07 season, Celtic signed strikers Kenny Miller and Jan Vennegoor of Hesselink as replacements for Hartson and Dion Dublin. Żurawski formed decent strike partnerships with both players. Having made a good start to the season, notching up 10 goals by January 2007, Żurawski then suffered an injury that kept him out for most of the season and scored no further goals during the campaign.

Chris Killen and Scott McDonald were signed before the start of season 2007–08. Żurawski started Celtic's opening day clash with Kilmarnock at Celtic Park, but fell down the pecking order after McDonald returned from suspension and Killen came back from injury. The only other impact Żurawski made during the season was scoring the winning penalty in a Champions League penalty shootout against Spartak Moscow. His time at Celtic was ultimately over after the signing of Georgios Samaras in January 2008.

Larissa
On the deadline day of the 2008 winter transfer window he was signed by the Greek side A.E. Larissa for £500,000. He scored a goal in his Greek league debut, the only goal of the game to defeat AEK Athens 1–0.
Żurawski was Larissa's top scorer for 2008–09 season with nine goals.

Omonia Nicosia
On 2 June 2009, it was announced that Żurawski had signed for Cypriot League runners-up Omonia Nicosia. He played for Omonia for one year and helped the team to return to titles after five years. He was released in May 2010.

Wisła Kraków
On 30 June 2010, Żurawski returned to Wisła Kraków after five years, on a one-year deal. In the 2010–11 season he won his fifth Ekstraklasa title with Wisła.

International career

World Cup 2002
Żurawski was selected in the Poland national team's 23-man squad for the 2002 FIFA World Cup finals in South Korea and Japan. He played in all three of the team's games and missed a penalty in the match against the United States, although Poland won 3–1.

World Cup 2006
He was selected in the 23-man Polish squad for the 2006 FIFA World Cup finals in Germany. His side finished third in the group and were eliminated at the first hurdle, losing to hosts Germany and a determined Ecuador before defeating Costa Rica. Zurawski did not score in any of the three matches.

Euro 2008
Zurawski was named as Captain in Poland's Euro 2008 squad, starting their first game against Germany on 8 June but later got injured and was substituted at half time. This injury meant that he would miss the rest of the tournament and the captaincy was given to Jacek Bąk and Michał Żewłakow for the second and third group stage matches.

Career statistics

Club

International goals
Scores and results list Poland's goal tally first, score column indicates score after each Żurawski goal.

Honours
Wisła Kraków
 Ekstraklasa: 2000–01, 2002–03, 2003–04, 2004–05, 2010–11
 Polish Cup: 2001–02, 2002–03
 Ekstraklasa Cup: 2000–01
 Polish SuperCup: 2001

Celtic
 Scottish Premier League: 2005–06, 2006–07, 2007–08
 Scottish Cup: 2006–07
 Scottish League Cup: 2005–06

Omonia
 Cypriot Championship: 2009–10

Individual
 Ekstraklasa top goalscorer: 2001–02, 2003–04
 Polish Footballer of the Year: 2002
 Football Oscar "Footballer of the Year": 2002
 Ekstraklasa Footballer of the Year: 2001, 2002
 Ekstraklasa Striker of the Year: 2003
 SPL Player of the Month: February 2006

References

External links

 
 
 National team stats on pzpn.pl 

1976 births
Living people
Footballers from Poznań
Polish footballers
Poland international footballers
Scottish Premier League players
Association football forwards
Lech Poznań players
Wisła Kraków players
Celtic F.C. players
2002 FIFA World Cup players
2006 FIFA World Cup players
Polish expatriate footballers
UEFA Euro 2008 players
Athlitiki Enosi Larissa F.C. players
AC Omonia players
Expatriate footballers in Scotland
Expatriate footballers in Greece
Expatriate footballers in Cyprus
Ekstraklasa players
Super League Greece players
Cypriot First Division players